Eurytrochus is a genus of sea snails, marine gastropod mollusks in the subfamily Trochinae of the family Trochidae, the top snails.

Description
The small shell is spirally lirate, depressed, and umbilicate. The body whorl is deflected toward the aperture. The oblique aperture is rounded-quadrangular. The terminations of the lips are approaching, connected by a callus. The outer and basal lips are crenulated within.

Distribution
This marine species occurs in Oceania, Japan, the Philippines and Australia (New South Wales, Queensland, Victoria)

Species
Species within the genus Eurytrochus include:
 Eurytrochus affinis (Garrett, 1872)
 Eurytrochus blanfordianus (G. Nevill, 1869)
 Eurytrochus charopiformis Willan, 2020
 Eurytrochus concinnus (Pilsbry, 1890)
 Eurytrochus danieli (Crosse, 1862)
 Eurytrochus fragarioides Willan, 2020
 Eurytrochus maccullochi (Hedley, C., 1907)
 Eurytrochus reevei Montrouzier, 1866
 Eurytrochus strangei (Adams, A., 1853)
 Species brought into synonymy
 Eurytrochus affinis cognatus (Pilsbry, 1903): synonym of Clanculus cognatus (Pilsbry, 1903)
 Eurytrochus bathyrhaphe (E. A. Smith, 1876) (taxon inquirendum, possible synonym of Eurytrochus reevei)
 Eurytrochus dacostana Preston, H.B., 1909: synonym of  Eurytrochus strangei (Adams, A., 1853)
 Eurytrochus sticticus (A. Adams, 1854) (uncertain)

References

 Hedley, C., 1923. Studies on Australian Mollusca. Part XIV.. Proc. Linn. Soc. N.S.W, 48:301-3163033
 Iredale, T. & McMichael, D.F., 1962 [31/Dec/1962]. A reference list of the marine Mollusca of New South Wales. Mem. Aust. Mus., 11:0-0

External links
 To GenBank 
 To World Register of Marine Species

 
Trochidae
Gastropod genera